Whitsett may refer to:
Whitsett, Kentucky
Whitsett, North Carolina
Whitsett, Pennsylvania

People with the surname Whitsett
Carson Whitsett
Doug Whitsett
Tim Whitsett
Vivicca Whitsett

See also
Whitsett Historic District (disambiguation)